St. Sebastian's Church, Katuwapitiya is a Roman Catholic church in the Archdiocese of Colombo. It is located in Katuwapitiya, Negombo.

Easter Attack 2019 

On 21 April 2019, Easter Sunday, the church was one in a series of targets of a string of bomb blasts across Sri Lanka. Media reported at least 93 people killed at the church, UNICEF reported that 27 children died and 10 children were injured. Altogether 45 children were killed in all blasts. President Maithripala Sirisena visited the church to inquire after the situation and inspect damages. The victims' funeral Mass was conducted at the church premises by Cardinal Malcolm Ranjith.

References 

Churches in Negombo
2019 Sri Lanka Easter bombings
Roman Catholic churches in Sri Lanka